Burning Bush Supper Club is the debut album by experimental rock outfit Bear Hands.

Track listing 

 "Crime Pays" (2:59)
 "Belongings" (4:01)
 "What a Drag" (3:03)
 "High Society" (2:33)
 "Tablasaurus" (3:13)
 "Julien" (3:54)
 "Wicksey Boxing" (4:01)
 "Blood and Treasure" (2:21)
 "Can't Stick 'Em" (3:25)
 "Camel Convention" (3:08)
 "Tall Trees" (1:29)

References 

2010 debut albums
Bear Hands albums